The 2022 Campeonato Paraense was the 110th edition of Pará's top professional football league. The competition started on 26 January and ended on 6 April. Remo won the championship for the 47th time.

Format
Three groups with four clubs, with the teams of one group facing those of the other two. The top two in each group advance to the final stage, along with the top two placed third. The matches of the quarter-finals, semi-finals, third place play-off and the finals will be played on a home-and-away two-legged basis.

The two worst teams in the overall standings will be relegated to the 2023 Campeonato Paraense Second Division.

The champion and the best placed team not qualified via CBF ranking qualify to the 2023 Copa Verde. The champion, the runner-up and the 3rd-placed team qualify to the 2023 Copa do Brasil. The best two teams who isn't on Campeonato Brasileiro Série A, Série B or Série C qualifies to 2023 Campeonato Brasileiro Série D.

Participating teams

Group stage

Group A

Group B

Group C

Final stage

Quarter-finals

Paysandu won 5–3 on aggregate and advanced to the semi-finals.

Águia de Marabá won 1–0 on aggregate and advanced to the semi-finals.

Tuna Luso won 5–1 on aggregate and advanced to the semi-finals.

Remo won 5–1 on aggregate and advanced to the semi-finals.

Semi-finals

Paysandu won 5–1 on aggregate and advanced to the semi-finals.

Tied 2–2 on aggregate, Remo won on penalties and advanced to the finals.

Third place play-off

Tied 5–5 on aggregate, Tuna Luso won on penalties.

Finals

Remo won 4–3 on aggregate.

References

Pará
2022 in Brazilian football
Campeonato Paraense